The DRDO Sarvatra (Everywhere) also known as Sarvatra Multi-span Mobile Bridge System is a truck-mounted, multi-span, mobile bridging system developed by Armament and Combat Engineering Systems (ACE) and Research and Development Establishment (R&DE) Engineers of Defence Research and Development Organisation (DRDO) for the Indian army. Its nodal production agency is Bharat Earth Movers Limited (BEML), Bangalore.

Description
The Sarvatra is a 75 meters long multi-span mobile bridging system consisting of five scissors bridges made of aluminum alloy with a span of 15 meters each mounted on separate mobile platforms. Each mobile platform is a modified Tatra T-815 VVN 8 x 8 chassis, drivable from both ends by having an additional small cabin with required driving controls. Further, a microprocessor based control system is utilised to deploy and operationalise the entire system in less than two and half hours.

When the 15 meter long scissors bridge is opened out it is fitted with adjustable trestles to enable a number of units to be used to bridge wet and dry gaps. All five sections are laid to provide a total bridge length of 75 m providing a roadway of four meters. The bridge is launched/recovered from either end. With the help of telescopic legs, the height of the bridge is adjusted from 2.5 m to 6 m so that it is not easily visible from afar.

The Sarvatra project was sanctioned in 1994 and completed development in October 1999 at a total cost of ₹230,000,000. It was approved for production in March 2000 after trials. The Sarvatra will replace the East European PMS Bridges in the service of the Indian army, which requires 57 Tatra vehicles to bridge 100 meters. In contrast, the Sarvatra, with just five Tatra trucks, bridges 75 meters. At ₹600,000,000 per set, the PMS costs almost three times as much as a Sarvatra.

A 20 m variant of Sarvatra bridge system capable of bridging a gap of 100 meters have also been developed.

Operators

 Indian Army : 110 units (22 sets) of 15M Sarvatra Bridge System variant on order.

Specifications
 Load Class: MLC–70
 Single Span Length:
 15 m
 20 m
 Multi-Span Capability:
 75 m
 100 m
 Roadway Width: 3.45 m during transportation; 4 m during use
 Span Height: 2.6 m to 6 m
 Construction time: 15 minutes
 Crew: 1 specialized driver + 3 combat engineers

See also
 Kartik BLT
 CEASE

References

External links
 Sarvatra mobile platform
 DRDO Sarvatra - Specifications
 Sarvatra Bridge system

Military vehicles of India